A.I.M. (Advanced Idea Mechanics) is a criminal organization appearing in American comic books published by Marvel Comics. In most versions, it is depicted as a think tank of brilliant scientists dedicated to overthrowing the world's governments through technological means. The organization started out as a branch of HYDRA, created by Baron Strucker. Its most notable creations include the Cosmic Cube, Super-Adaptoid, and MODOK; the latter has been depicted as a prominent member of A.I.M., and in some incarnations is the organization's leader.

A.I.M. has been featured in several media adaptations, including television series and video games. The organization made its cinematic debut in the Marvel Cinematic Universe film Iron Man 3 (2013), in this universe headed by Aldrich Killian.

Publication history

The organization known as A.I.M. first appeared in Strange Tales #146 (July 1966), and is revealed to be a branch of the organization known as THEM in Strange Tales #147 (Aug. 1966), a larger organization mentioned in Strange Tales #142 (March 1966), and depicted in Tales of Suspense #78 (June 1966) a few months earlier. It is later revealed that THEM is also a parent organization to the Secret Empire and that it is, in fact, a new incarnation of the previously dissolved organization HYDRA in Strange Tales #149 (October 1966).

Organization
A.I.M. is described as an organization of scientists and their hirelings dedicated to the acquisition of power and to overthrow all the world's governments through science and technology. Its leadership traditionally consists of the seven-member Board of Directors (formerly known as the Imperial Council) with a rotating chairperson. Under the Directors are various division supervisors, and under them are the technicians and salesmen/dealers.

The organization supplies arms and technology to various terrorist and subversive organizations both to foster a violent technological revolution and to generate profit. A.I.M. operatives are usually involved in research, development, manufacturing, and sales of high technology. Members of A.I.M. are required to at least have a master's degree, if not a PhD, in some area of science, mathematics, or business.

A.I.M.'s reach is worldwide, including various front organizations such as Targo Corporation, International Data Integration and Control, Cadenza Industries, Koenig and Strey, Pacific Vista Laboratories, Allen's Department Store, and Omnitech. It also has had a number of bases of operations, including a nuclear submarine mobile in the Atlantic Ocean; bases in the Bronx, New York; Black Mesa, Colorado; West Caldwell, New Jersey; Asia, Canada, Europe, Haiti, India, Sudan and Boca Caliente (also known as A.I.M. Island), an island republic in the Caribbean.

Technology
Over its appearances A.I.M. has produced three major implements of deadly potential. The greatest of these is the Cosmic Cube, a device capable of altering reality. However, A.I.M. does not realize that the cube is merely a containment device, in which the real power is an entity accidentally drawn into their dimension. The Cosmic Cube eventually evolves into Kubik. Their second achievement is the Super-Adaptoid, an android capable of mimicking the appearance and superpowers of other beings, which is made possible by incorporating a sliver of the Cosmic Cube into its form. When Kubik repossesses the sliver after defeating the Adaptoid, the android is rendered inanimate. A.I.M.'s third and final major achievement is the creation of MODOK (Mental Organism Designed Only for Killing), an artificially mutated human with an enormous head accompanied by a massive computational brain and psionic abilities. MODOK is originally an A.I.M. scientist named George Tarleton, who was selected by A.I.M.'s leader at the time, the Scientist Supreme, to be the subject of the bionic and genetic experiments that turned him into MODOK. After his transformation, MODOK kills the Scientist Supreme and takes control of A.I.M., and later takes advantage of the chaos in HYDRA's organization following HYDRA Island's destruction and the deaths of Baron Strucker and most of HYDRA's leading members to sever all of A.I.M.'s ties with HYDRA. A.I.M. has remained independent ever since.

Its scientists have also built various cyborgs, robots, and androids. Its agents utilize a variety of submarines, hovercraft, jets, and other vehicles. A.I.M. has also attempted to recreate versions of MODOK, including transforming Dr. Katherine Waynesboro into Ms. MODOK and creating SODAM (later revamped as MODAM). Since A.I.M's redirection as an exotic arms dealer, members have access to whatever exotic weaponry available in its warehouses.

A.I.M.'s leaders traditionally wear yellow three-piece business suits. Technical supervisors wear yellow jumpsuits, skull-caps, and goggles. However, the organization is renowned for the 'beekeeper'-looking helmets and NBC suit uniform of its underlings since the first appearance.

As a result of the "Scorpion: Poison Tomorrow" arc of Amazing Fantasy, A.I.M. gained a new costume, which tends towards insectoid armor and large guns.

The Livewires member named Cornfed wears an A.I.M. uniform. He also wears a button referencing "The Real A.I.M".

Fictional organization history
A.I.M.'s origins begin late in World War II with Baron Wolfgang von Strucker's creation of his subversive organization HYDRA. Under the code name of THEM, he creates two HYDRA branches called Advanced Idea Mechanics and the Secret Empire. A.I.M.'s purpose is to develop advanced weaponry for HYDRA. They are close to developing and attaining nuclear weapons when HYDRA Island is invaded by American and Japanese troops. Although HYDRA suffers a major setback, it survives and grows in secret over the following decades.

A.I.M. has numerous encounters with various superheroes and supervillains, and is the subject of ongoing undercover investigations by S.H.I.E.L.D. It is responsible for reviving the Red Skull from suspended animation. An A.I.M. android factory in a Florida swamp is at one time raided by S.H.I.E.L.D., which also involves Count Bornag Royale in a weapons deal negotiation with S.H.I.E.L.D. A.I.M. then raids S.H.I.E.L.D.'s New York City headquarters. As a result of these events, Royale is discredited, and A.I.M.'s headquarters are destroyed.

A.I.M. employs Batroc the Leaper to recover an explosive compound called Inferno 42 and dispatches a chemical android against Nick Fury and Captain America. A.I.M. also dispatches their special agent, the Cyborg, against Captain America. A.I.M. is involved in a skirmish with the Maggia and its "Big M". A.I.M. also captures Iron Man in an attempt to analyze and replicate his armor. MODOK and A.I.M. are responsible for transforming Betty Ross briefly into the gamma-irradiated bird-woman called the Harpy. A.I.M. dispatches their special agent the Destructor to capture Ms. Marvel.

For a time, a schism develops within A.I.M., causing it to split into Blue and Yellow factions (the former loyal to MODOK, the latter independent from him). These factions battle each other, with MODOK and the Blue faction employing Deathbird as an operative. A.I.M. capture the Thing and Namor to test Virus X on them. The Blue faction later makes an attempt to recapture the Cosmic Cube. A second battle occurs between the rival factions, but factions no longer seem to be active within A.I.M. since then.

A.I.M. eventually hires the Serpent Society to kill MODOK, which they do. A.I.M. is responsible for a jet attack on the West Coast Avengers compound and then takes over Boca Caliente and unleashes a microbe aboard the Stark space satellite. A.I.M. also sends an agent to attempt to confiscate the quantum-bands given to Quasar.

The organization is revealed to have become a 'techno-anarchist' group, with no connection to HYDRA, and even a hatred for fascism. With the introduction of the Death's Head 3.0 character, a pacifist future version of the organization is promised, with a new leader.

It is later revealed that A.I.M. helps General Thunderbolt Ross and Doc Samson create the Red Hulk.

A.I.M. is revealed to be behind the pocket dimension of Earth-13584 by using a sliver of time they obtain to alter certain events so they can obtain the technology and science from various individuals. They do this by exploiting the fluid nature of time brought on by the manipulations of Kang the Conqueror traveling back to alter the past. This lasts until the Dark Avengers end up in this reality, causing it to collapse. The Dark Avengers are able to get out before the pocket dimension collapses.

After the Secret Avengers recruit Taskmaster after freeing him from Bagalia, they send him to infiltrate the new High Council of A.I.M. which consists of Andrew Forson, Graviton, Jude the Entropic Man, Mentallo, Superia, and Yelena Belova. Andrew Forson then leads A.I.M. into attending a weapons expo, where A.I.M. fights against the Secret Avengers. During the battle, Andrew Forson takes the opportunity to steal the Iron Patriot armor.

Daisy Johnson launches an unsanctioned operation to send the Secret Avengers to A.I.M. Island to assassinate Forson, and they seemingly kill him. Johnson is suspended for breaking protocol and Maria Hill is put in charge of S.H.I.E.L.D. again. As Forson is revealed to be alive all along, the news of A.I.M. being a new permanent member of the Security Council is known.

Using an unidentified device in the pages of Avengers World, Andrew Forson and A.I.M. accelerate the flow of time within the limits of A.I.M. Island, creating in a matter of hours for the real world a year of progress and transforming A.I.M. into a technologically advanced empire.

A.I.M. has a more violent offshoot, Advanced Ideas of Destruction (A.I.D.); the two competing organizations are major antagonists of Captain America in the mid-2000s.

As part of the "All-New, All-Different Marvel", it is revealed that the A.I.M. members that fled when Sunspot bought out A.I.M. have been taken in by Maker where they work for his organization W.H.I.S.P.E.R. (short for World Headquarters for International Scientific Philosophical Experimentation and Research) as his personal tool to reshape the world.

After Sunspot leaves the American Intelligence Mechanics, Toni Ho succeeds him and allows the rogue A.I.M. cells to regain their acronym, as Toni has her organization rebranded as R.E.S.C.U.E.

Heroic offshoots

Avengers Idea Mechanics
During the Time Runs Out storyline which takes place eight months in the future, Sunspot reveals that he bought A.I.M and used their resources to investigate the incursions. Heroes working as part of Avengers Idea Mechanics include Hawkeye, Squirrel Girl, Songbird, Wiccan, Hulkling, White Tiger, Power Man and Pod. Sunspot reveals the group was much easier to deal with after much of higher management had been fired. Many heroes working in the primary Avengers team such as Thor and Hyperion, also find themselves working side by side with A.I.M. Once they managed to create a machine to propel individuals across the Multiverse some of the heroes who were helping A.I.M. offered themselves to participate in a one-way trip to find the origin of the Incursions threatening all reality.

Following the fight against Maker, Sunspot meets with the government and they make plans to merge Avengers Idea Mechanics into the U.S. government. At the same time, the Avengers Idea Mechanics defeats A.I.M's splinter groups.

American Intelligence Mechanics
The merger between the U.S. government and the Avengers Idea Mechanics results in the formation of the American Intelligence Mechanics. Since Da Costa had turned the organization into weapon for good, rogue cells exist fighting for A.I.M.'s original goals on behalf of their former leaders, Andrew Forson and Monica Rappaccini. To tackle the nuisance by these cells, Da Costa's successor Toni Ho decides to let them reclaim the organization's acronym, while rebranding her own organization into a new one called R.E.S.C.U.E.

Splinter groups
Some AIM splinter cells have appeared in various issues:
 Advanced Ideas in Destruction (AID)
 Michael Friedman – 
 Radically Advanced Ideas in Destruction' (RAID) – AIM-like company, designed exoskeleton, forced to help Captain America track the Cosmic Cube
 Advanced Genocide Mechanics (AGM) – Located in the Congo. Led by MODOG (Mental Organism Designed Only for Genocide).

Fronts
 Adarco Corporation (Advanced Robotic Company) – A company that developed Annex and BREW technology.
 Dr. Hillman Barto – Ally of Annex. He is currently deceased
 Brace – A cyborg. Destroyed by Annex
 Cadence Industries – Entertainment Media company that collected the corpse of MODOK
 IDIC (International Data Integration and Control) – 
 Diadem (Lucieane D'Hiven) – 
 Kenjiro Tanaka –  – A former S.H.I.E.L.D. agent who trained alongside Wendell Vaughn. He infiltrated IDIC and stayed on as employee after the break-up of SHIELD. He later left to join Vaughn Securities, and was promoted to partner and eventual CEO due to Vaughan spending less time on Earth.
 Koenig and Strey – It is based in Manhattan. It was invaded by Bullseye, Deadpool, Juggernaut, Sabretooth, and The Vulture on behalf of Valeria Jessup.
 Omnitech – 
 Targo Corporation –

Leaders
 Alessandro Brannex (Super-Adaptoid) – An android and chairman of the board.
 Monica Rappaccini – Mother of Carmilla Black, Scientist Supreme, and an Italian national. She has a PhD in biochemistry from the University of Padua. She became a radical, and developed poisons for the Black Orchestra and A.I.M.. Monica has sought to reestablish contact with her daughter.
 George Tarleton a.k.a. MODOK (Mental Organism Designed Only for Killing) – Former A.I.M. scientist and current leader of A.I.M. under the rank of Scientist Supreme. He was mutated by George Clinton and driven insane by energies present at the creation of Earth's first Cosmic Cube. Originally was supposed to be called MODOC (Mental Organism Designed Only for Computing). Father of Head Case (Sean Madigan)

High Council of A.I.M.
 Andrew Forson – The Supreme Leader of the High Council of A.I.M.
 Graviton – The Minister of Science.
 Jude the Entropic Man – The Minister of Health.
 Mentallo – The Minister of Public Affairs.
 Superia – The Minister of Education.
 Taskmaster – The Minister of Defense (undercover for the Secret Avengers).
 Yelena Belova – The Minister of State.

Former
 George Clinton – Former Scientist Supreme. He was involved in the creation of MODOC/MODOK and the Cosmic Cube. His mind was eventually drained by the Red Skull, Arnim Zola, and the Hate-Monger (a clone of Adolf Hitler) in an attempt to recreate the Cosmic Cube.
 Chet Madden – Former head of A.I.M. and former client of Connie Ferrari.
 Dr. Lyle Getz – A former Scientist Supreme. He is currently deceased.
 Head Case (Sean Madigan) – The long-lost son of MODOK.
 Maxwell Mordius – Currently deceased
 Valdemar Tykkio – Scientist Supreme. He instituted a takeover of Boca Caliente. He is the brother of Yorgon Tykkio.
 Wolfgang von Strucker (Baron Strucker) – A Nazi and the founder of HYDRA
 Alvin Tarleton<ref name="M.O.D.O.K.: Head Games #4">"M.O.D.O.K.: Head Games" #4. Marvel Comics.</ref> - George Tarleton's father and one of the original founders of A.I.M. He got his son a job with the organization as a custodian, then authorized his transformation into M.O.D.O.C/K. After the transformation drove his son mad, he was driven out by M.O.D.O.K. and forced to hide-out in the fake superb of Butterville, Ohio. Eventually his son began malfunctioning and experiencing false memories, which Alvin used to lure him to his base so he could capture him and reset his brain, hoping to repeat their initial experiment with more successful results. M.O.D.O.K killed his father by activating his Uru phone before the mind wipe could be completed, then uploaded his father's consciousness onto the phone so he could "swipe left on him.

Members and agents
 AD-45 Riot-Bots
 Abu-Jamal Rodriguez – 
 Alexandre Copernicus – 
 Andrew Ritter – 
 Arthur Shaman – hypnotist, kidnapped Michael Barnett and attempted to force the Hulk to kill Ms. Marvel
 B'Tumba – A Wakandan who is the son of N'Baza, and an old friend of T'Challa. He allied with A.I.M. to sell vibranium. B'Tumba eventually sacrificed his life to save T'Challa from A.I.M.
 Baron Rolando Samedi – An A.I.M. agent who created pseudo-zuvembies and fought Brother Voodoo. He is not to be confused with the deity of the same name.
 Bernard Worrell –  – Member of A.I.M.'s Blue Faction; former apprentice of George Clinton; led the capture of the Cosmic Cube/Kubik, but was unable to control it once it began its metamorphosis into Kubik
 Betty Sumitro
 Betty Swanson
 Brace – 
 Brendon Newton – 
 Cache – artificial intelligence.
 Carl Alexis Lombardi – A.I.M. agent, sought Uni-Power, slew David Garrett when he had outlived his usefulness, confessed after being captured by Daredevil
 Clete Billups – Infiltrated S.H.I.E.L.D.; revealed himself and killed his "partners" to steal the body of Protocide, he was duped by Captain America and Sharon Carter into leading them to A.I.M.'s headquarters.
 Clytemnestra Erwin – infiltrated Stark Enterprises to gain revenge on Tony Stark for causing the death of her brother Morley. Killed by an out-of-control A.I.M. missile.
 Commander Robert Cypher – Sought technology to take control of nuclear missiles
 Count Bornag Royale – 
 Cyborg – hired assassin
 David Garrett – ally of A.I.M., funded Gilbert Wiles to monitoring his tracking of the Uni-Power, slain by Lombardi after outliving his usefulness
 Destructor (Kerwin Korman) – former premier weapons-maker, stumbled on and unleashed the power core of Kree Psyche-Magnitron, later built into the Doomsday Man by A.I.M. technicians and used as its power source, discovered and freed by Avengers, required continued connection to the remnants of the Doomsday Man for life support.
 Doctor Nemesis (Michael Craig Stockton) –
 Doomsday Man – virtually indestructible robot created by Dr. Kronton to steal cobalt bombs and blackmail the U.S., initially defeated by Silver Surfer, later revived by Kree Psyche-Magnitron, battled and destroyed by Ms. Marvel, rebuilt by A.I.M. and merged with Kerwin Korman, whom it used as a power source, battled Avengers, sought Warbird as replacement when Kerwin began to weaken, destroyed by Justice, remnants used as life support for Korman.
 Dr. Cristiano Ryder – posed as a S.H.I.E.L.D. agent to regain control of Android X-4.
 Dr. Ralph Rider –  – brother of Charles Rider, uncle of Richard and Robert Rider, leading research scientist until killed by Photon (Jason Dean)
 Evelyn Necker – Earth-8410 liaison
 Fixer (Paul Norbert Ebersol) – 
 Grizzly – A.I.M. agent R-1, used by MODOK in a plot to capture atomic scientist Paul Fosgrave; not to be confused with the Spider-Man enemy or Cable's deceased teammate.
 Harness (Erika Benson) – mother of Piecemeal; forced him to locate and absorb the energy of Proteus; wore an armored exo-skeleton.
 Harold Bainbridge - An A.I.M. Agent that Mockingbird impersonated during the Secret Avengers' raid on A.I.M. Island.
 Highwayman – English criminal, agent of A.I.M., attempted to steal the Cognium Steel from Oracle INC., but was defeated by Iron Fist.
 Hyun Rahman – 
 Ian Fitzpatrick (Mr. Jinx)
 James Hendrickson
 Jason Rilker – 
 Jethro Prufrock – father of George and Martha Prufock, was a perennial right-wing Libertarian candidate for president and a staunch advocate of arms-stockpiling; he was slain by a mutated George
 Julia Black – adoptive mother of Carmilla Black, former ties to Symbionese Liberation Army, currently deceased
 Lifeform (George Prufrock) – was mutated into a progressively larger carnivorous creature by exposure to experimental virus developed by his father, Jethro Prufock, at A.I.M.
 MODAM (Olinka Barankova) – A creation of A.I.M. whose name is an acronym for Mobile Organism Designed for Aggressive Maneuvers, who also operated under the names "Maria Pym" and SODAM (an acronym for Specialized Organism Designed for Aggressive Maneuvers). Killed by MODOK
 Marc Planck – 
 Mentallo (Marvin Flumm)
 Njeri Damphousse – currently still with A.I.M.
 Paul Allen – He infiltrated S.H.I.E.L.D. His current whereabouts are unknown.
 Peggy Park – 
 Professor Aaron Whyte – 
 Ramona Starr – shot Ka-Zar in the head and then forced him to perform a mission for A.I.M.; also known as Ramona Courtland
 Red Skull (Johann Schmidt) – 
 Seekers –
 Solemne Brannex – Possibly the sister of Allesandro Brannex, sought aid from S.H.I.E.L.D. when A.I.M. obtained a Shi'ar vessel
 Stryke
 Super-Adaptoid – A robot that can copy the appearance and superpowers of anyone.
 Timekeeper – scientist and leader of an A.I.M. outpost in Venture Ridge, Wyoming; he attempted to tap into the power of Holly-Ann Ember
 Timothy Black – adoptive father of Carmilla Black, former ties to Symbionese Liberation Army, currently deceased
 Ultra-Adaptoid – A stronger version of the Super-Adaptoid.
 Victorius (Victor Conrad)
 Wakers – A.I.M. deep penetration agents under the leadership of Scorpion (Carmilla Black) and four others, genetically engineered to resist all chemical, biological, and nuclear weapons
 Lars Branco – Waker agent; currently deceased
 Warbot – A.I.M. weapon, used by Arthur Shaman to capture the Hulk to use against Ms. Marvel, destroyed by her
 Yorgon Tykkio – brother of Valdemar; became a cyborg and led a revolt against his brother's rule; controlled the body of MODOK and destroyed it after he was defeated in battle against Iron Man; allied with Clytemnestra Erwin against Tony Stark/Iron Man; was killed by Clytemnestra when she was attempting to flee from him

Avengers/American Idea Mechanics members
 Roberto da Costa - The Supreme Leader following his acquisition and buying out of A.I.M.'s faculties. 
 Dr. Toni Ho - A scientist and engineer whose work emulates Stark's Iron Man designs. She became the second Rescue and later the third Iron Patriot.
 Red Hulk (General Robert Maverick) - A general who uses a Hulk Plug-In to become his version of Red Hulk for an hour.

 Reception 

 Accolades 

 In 2019, CBR.com ranked A.I.M. 7th in their "10 Most Powerful Secret Organizations In Marvel Comics" list and 10th in their "10 Most Evil Teams In Marvel" list.

Other versions
A.I.M. has outposts active in several other universes in the Marvel Multiverse, including the universes for Ultimate Marvel, Marvel 1602, and Age of Apocalypse.

Heroes Reborn
In the Heroes Reborn reality, A.I.M. is led by Baron Zemo and MODOK as they take on Captain America and the new Bucky, Rebecca Barnes.

2020 Death's Head Future
A future (2020) version of A.I.M is featured heavily in the Marvel UK limited series Death's Head II. This future organisation creates the cyborg Minion, which is later taken over by the personality of Death's Head. A.I.M's representative Evelyn Necker became a popular character in the ongoing series that followed.

In Amazing Fantasy #16–20, set further in the same future, A.I.M is on the point of making peace with the UN, when a renegade A.I.M. scientist unleashes Death's Head 3.0 on the peace conference.

House of M
In the House of M reality, A.I.M. is re-imagined as a human resistance movement led by Monica Rappacini to oppose Exodus, ruler of Australia and his cohorts.

Marvel Adventures
In the Marvel Adventures version of Iron Man, A.I.M., through the use of dummy companies, acquires Stark International's hover platform and uni-beam technology in their invasion of Madripoor, a third world country. Gia-Bao Yinsen tries to tell the world about A.I.M.'s terrorist attacks on his country, but his message is dismissed. During Tony Stark's test of his new solar-powered glider, A.I.M. causes Tony to crash on their artificial island. Tony's heart is damaged, and A.I.M. forces him to build an EMP weapon to allow A.I.M.'s forces to finish their conquest of Madripoor. In exchange, A.I.M. will repair his heart. Tony learns that Yinsen was also kidnapped, as A.I.M. wanted to prevent him from telling the world about their attacks on his country and to use his intellect to build technology for A.I.M.. Similar to Iron Man's main Marvel Universe origin, Yinsen and Tony both build armor to escape. However, Yinsen destroys the generator powering the island to save his homeland. The explosion kills Yinsen, but Tony Stark lives. Tony becomes Iron Man to prevent people like A.I.M. from committing evil against innocents. Here, the Supreme Scientist is a black-haired woman who is extremely brilliant. In addition, the uniforms that A.I.M. uses are basically NBC orange suits. However, the Supreme Scientist wears black clothing in a style similar to Darth Vader.

Ultimate Marvel
In the Ultimate Marvel reality, A.I.M. commissions Mad Thinker to steal Cerebro from the X-Men and frame the Fantastic Four, as seen in the Ultimate X4 mini-series. The miniseries Ultimate Vision introduces A.I.M. as composed of several directorates spread across the globe, with George Tarleton as an A.I.M. leader on an orbital research facility. Tarleton and his team attempt to take control of a Gah Lak Tus module that is left behind in orbit after the swarm is driven away. Being unable to do so on their own, they lure Vision to the station to help them by claiming they will use the knowledge to order the Gah Lak Tus swarm to self-destruct. Once the cyborg Tarleton connects to the module using Vision, he has the module fire an energy beam at her. Tarleton then incorporates the Gah Lak Tus' circuitry into his own body, but it seemingly takes over him, transforming him more into a machine, with a monstrous appearance. He takes over the entire station remotely and sets it to plummet out of orbit, along with the Gah Lak Tus module, which he says has "unfinished business on Earth." Ultimately, Tarleton is broken free of the module's control and helps the Vision and the Falcon a.k.a. Dr. Samuel Wilson in destroying the module.

In Ultimate Comics: Avengers, a group of A.I.M. terrorists steal advanced technology (revealed to be blueprints for a Cosmic Cube) from the Baxter Building and have some associations with the Red Skull.Ultimate Avengers #5. Marvel Comics.

In other media
Television
 Though they go unnamed, a group of A.I.M. agents make a cameo in a flashback in the Spider-Man and His Amazing Friends episode "The X-Men Adventure". They attacked the lab where Firestar and Nathan Price worked at before he became the villain Cyberiad.
 A.I.M. appears in Iron Man.
 A.I.M. appears in Iron Man: Armored Adventures, with the Scientist Supreme, the Controller and MODOC as prominent members. 
 A.I.M. appears in The Avengers: Earth's Mightiest Heroes.
 A.I.M. appears in Marvel Anime: Wolverine.
 A.I.M. appears in Avengers Assemble.
 A.I.M. appears in Spider-Man. In the episode "School of Hard Knocks", A.I.M. uses an elite boarding school called the Bilderberg Academy as a front for Monica Rappaccini to experiment on students and grant them the combined powers of the captured Captain America, Captain Marvel, and Hulk. Spider-Man and Ms. Marvel infiltrate Bilderberg Academy and undo Rappaccini's experiments while Iron Man and Black Widow capture the A.I.M. agents present. In the episode "A Troubled Mind", A.I.M. steals three mental projection devices and combine them with their robotics to create MODOK, only for both to be defeated by the Superior Spider-Man, Iron Man, Black Widow, and Ms. Marvel. In the episode "Amazing Friends", A.I.M. collaborates with Baron Mordo to capture Groot and use him as a template for mystical wood golems, only to be stopped by Spider-Man, Miles Morales, Ironheart, Doctor Strange, and the Totally Awesome Hulk.
 A.I.M. appears in M.O.D.O.K. This version is entirely founded and led by MODOK, although he eventually causes the organization to go bankrupt and allows the rival company GRUMBL to buy it out. Throughout the series, MODOK continually schemes to reclaim his position as A.I.M.'s leader and eliminate GRUMBL CEO Austin Van Der Sleet, although these attempts continually end in failure and lead to him being demoted and replaced by Monica Rappaccini as Scientist Supreme. Meanwhile, Van Der Sleet uses A.I.M.'s resources and technology to further the plans of his superior, Hexus, the Living Corporation. By the end of the first season, MODOK sells his A.I.M. shares to Iron Man, enabling him to buy out A.I.M. from GRUMBL, while MODOK, Rappaccini, and A.I.M. subordinate Gary go on to establish A-I-M-2 independently.

Film
 A.I.M. appears in the anime film Iron Man: Rise of Technovore. They are hired by Ezekiel Stane and Sasha Hammer to develop a techno-organic virus called Technovore.
 A.I.M. appears in the live-action Marvel Cinematic Universe film Iron Man 3. This version is a government-sanctioned, privately funded think-tank founded by Aldrich Killian, which goes on to develop the Extremis virus and design the Iron Patriot armor.

Video games
 A.I.M. troopers and attack bots appear in Marvel Ultimate Alliance, with the former voiced by Steve Blum.
 A.I.M. appears in the 2008 Iron Man film tie-in game. They work with Obadiah Stane to develop an army of Iron Men based on Tony Stark's original prototype suit. Although their attempts to develop an effective power source fail, they are able to create Titanium Man. However, Iron Man defeats him before thwarting A.I.M.'s attempt to generate power using a solar collection satellite grid.
 A.I.M. appears in the PS2 and PSP versions of Spider-Man: Web of Shadows, having aligned themselves with Spencer Smythe.
 A.I.M. agents appear in Marvel Super Hero Squad, voiced by Travis Willingham, Nolan North, and Troy Baker.
 A.I.M. appears in the Iron Man 2 film tie-in game, with its agents voiced by Catherine Campion, Andrew Chaikin, Denny Delk, Eric Goldberg, Adam Harrington, and Roger L. Jackson. They work with Kearson DeWitt in collaboration with Roxxon to perfect the Ultimo Program.
 A.I.M. and their R.A.I.D. (Radically Advanced Ideas of Destruction) branch appear in Marvel Avengers Alliance.
 A.I.M. appears in Iron Man 3: The Official Game.
 A.I.M. appears in Marvel Heroes. Led by MODOK, they work in collaboration with the Wizard and Doctor Octopus.
 A.I.M. appears in Lego Marvel Super Heroes. Led by MODOK, they are among the supervillains that allied themselves with Doctor Doom. Iron Man, Thor, and Spider-Man track Doom aboard an A.I.M. submarine, where they defeat MODOK and his agents.
 A.I.M., hybridized with Resident Evils Umbrella Corporation to create "A.I.M.brella", appears as a stage in Marvel vs. Capcom Infinite. Unlike other fused locations, which were created by Ultron Sigma after they fused their respective universes together, A.I.M.brella was a proper company merger, as both A.I.M. and Umbrella are led by warped scientists who chose to pool their resources.
 A.I.M. agents appear in Lego Marvel Super Heroes 2.
 A.I.M. is referenced in Spider-Man, providing funding to Otto Octavius when the city rescinds his development grant.
 A.I.M. appears in Marvel's Avengers. Founded by Dr. George Tarleton after the events of "A-Day", this version is a powerful multinational corporation made to protect the world through science as opposed to superheroes. They also develop robotic synthoids for public service duties, security forces, and to manage the growing population of Inhumans. Five years after A-Day, A.I.M. has established a virtual police state in the U.S. Additionally, a young Inhuman named Kamala Khan discovers that the company's leaders are experimenting on Inhumans rather than curing them, and also harvesting their powers to create an army of Adaptoids to replace the Avengers. A warped Tarleton, now MODOK, intends to wipe out all Inhumans and superpowers on Earth, but he is defeated by Khan and the Avengers. After he is presumed dead, Monica Rappaccini assumes control of A.I.M. and its assets. Realizing that the company is still an active threat, the Avengers partner with S.H.I.E.L.D. to locate and take out A.I.M.'s remaining facilities around the world.

Live performance
A.I.M. appears in the arena show Marvel Universe: LIVE!.

Miscellaneous
Members of A.I.M. appear in issue #5 of The Avengers: United They Stand comic book series.

Critical reception
Both A.I.M. and Hydra first appeared in the 1960s as analogues for the threat of Communism, but are also associated with Nazism and resemble organizations fought by Captain America in World War II. Political science professor Matthew J. Costello has pointed out that this conflation of Communist and Nazi totalitarianism removes ambiguity from the threat and thus from America's moral superiority in the comics. In contrast, in the post-9/11 context of Iron Man 3'', Pepper says of Extremis' war profiteering, "That's exactly what [Stark Industries] used to do". Whereas immediately after 9/11 Captain America was concerned with Islamic terrorism, by 2005–2007 he was primarily engaged with homegrown terrorists: A.I.M. and A.I.D.

References

External links
 A.I.M at Marvel.com
 

Comic book terrorist organizations
Comics characters introduced in 1966
Fictional companies
Fictional intelligence agencies
Fictional organizations in Marvel Comics
Marvel Comics scientists
Marvel Comics supervillain teams